{|

{{Infobox ship career
| Hide header              = 
| Ship name                = 
1968-1981: Munster
1983-1989: Farah In'
1991-2002: Tianpeng 
| Ship operator            = 
1965-1981: B+I Line
1981-2002: various
| Ship registry            = 
| Ship route               = 
| Ship ordered             = 
| Ship builder             = Nobiskrug, Rendsburg
| Ship original cost       = 
| Ship yard number         = 657
| Ship way number          = 
| Ship laid down           = 
| Ship launched            = 25 January 1968
| Ship completed           = 
| Ship christened          = 
| Ship acquired            = 
| Ship maiden voyage       = 
| Ship in service          = 
| Ship out of service      = 2002
| Ship identification      = 
| Ship fate                = Scrapped 2002
| Ship notes               = 
}}

|}
MV Munster was built in 1968 and operated initially for the British and Irish Steam Packet Company (B+I Line). The  5000-ton ship (as built) had capacity for 1,000 passengers and 220 cars. The ship was also known as the Farah In and Tianpeng before being scrapped in 2002.

History
The ship was initially ordered by the Scandinavian Lion Ferries but was purchased by B+I Line before completion for operations on the Dublin to Liverpool route. The original intended owners had specified a strengthened hull to operate through ice, and McNeill noted her as the only "ice-capable" regularly on the Irish Sea in her era. Munster had no Sky lounge above the bridge which could identify her from her B+I sisters.

Bow and stern doors allowed a turnaround time of 1 hour. The ship was equipped with bow thrusters and stabilizers.

From the later 1970s the ship began to diverge from the Liverpool—Dublin  route, with charters to Brittany Ferries and Egersund Thyborøn as well as use on south Irish Sea routes. From 1983 she was sold and renamed Farah In and used on Aqaba — Suez.

The ship was sold to Dalian Steamship of China in 1991 and renamed Tianpeng''. It was scrapped in 2002.

References

Sources
 
 
 

1968 ships